The Batangas Bulls is a baseball team competing in Baseball Philippines, the Philippines' premier baseball circuit/competition.

Roster

External links
 Baseball Philippines Official Website
 https://www.facebook.com/baseballphilippines

Baseball Philippines
Baseball teams in the Philippines
Sports in Batangas